Moody Gardens is an educational tourist destination, with a golf course and hotel in Galveston, Texas which opened in 1986. The non-profit destination uses nature to educate and excite visitors about conservation and wildlife.

Moody Gardens features three main pyramid attractions: the Aquarium Pyramid, which is one of the largest in the region and holds many species of fish and other marine animals; the Rainforest Pyramid, which contains tropical plants, animals, birds, butterflies, reptiles, and a variety of other rainforest animals including free-roaming monkeys and two-toed sloths; and the Discovery Pyramid, which focuses on science-oriented exhibits and activities.

Another major attraction at Moody Gardens is Palm Beach, a landscaped white sand beach mainly open in the summer, with a small water park for children, freshwater lagoons, a lazy river, tower slides, a hot tub, ziplines, and a splash pad play area for children. Moody Gardens also had at one time a RideFilm Theater with motion-based pod seating, the MG 3D Theater features the largest screen in the state of Texas, 4D Special FX Theater, paddlewheel cruise boat, a hotel, golf course and a convention center.

The complex attracts many local tourists from the city of Houston and its outlying suburbs. The owners commissioned a landscape design from Geoffrey Jellicoe. It is described in Gardens of the Mind: the Genius of Geoffrey Jellicoe by Michael Spens (Antique Collectors Club, 1992).

Aquarium Pyramid
This blue pyramid opened in 1999 is approximately 12 stories high. The massive pools that are contained in this pyramid contain approximately 10,000 marine animals from fish, sharks, seals and penguins. Each representing different regions of the sea: North Pacific, South Pacific, South Atlantic and Caribbean.

Rainforest Pyramid

This clear pyramid opened in 1993 and reaches the height of 10 stories. After Hurricane Ike, a $25 million enhancement project brought nature closer to visitors. The multi-level Rainforests of the World project focuses on education, conservation and possible future breeding with new rare and endangered animals. Giant Amazon river otters, saki monkeys, ocelots, and a wide range of other animals, birds, reptiles make up more than 1,000 species of exotic species showcased the diversity of the rainforest environment.

The rainforests of Asia, Africa, and the Americas are featured through the popular bat caves, crashing waterfalls, and Mayan Ruins. The warm, humid interior simulates the climate of rainforests on warm days.

Discovery Pyramid
The Discovery Pyramid opened in 1997 and features traveling exhibits and the ride film (motion simulator). In May of 2015, Moody Gardens added a permanent exhibit to the bottom level of the Discovery Pyramid, the SpongeBob SubPants Adventure ride. In this amusement ride, the audience "dives into adventure on a submarine voyage along with SpongeBob and all his Bikini Bottom friends!". In 2019, the SpongeBob SubPants Adventure was closed and replaced by “20,000 Leagues Under The Sea: An Interactive Adventure”. This interactive 4D film follows a technologically enhanced pufferfish named Deep as he leads the Nautilus submarine through different parts of the ocean as chosen by the audience. Deep is portrayed by a live actor, who voices and controls the character in real time, creating effectively a personalized show for every audience. 

The upper level of the huge deep pink colored Discovery Pyramid is currently featuring JAM REMASTERED: THE SCIENCE OF MUSIC, an experience that explores the connection between music, science and mathematics (Updated June 2021)

Palm Beach
Palm Beach opened in 1988, initially with a constructed white sand beach and later expanded to a full use water park. The water park features Aquarium Adventure, a group of slides with a dump bucket, a wave pool, a lazy river, Tower Slides (two water slides), and Splashpad, the toddler section of the water park. The artificial beach is made with white sand and is situated adjacent to, but not connected to Galveston Bay.

Moody Gardens Zip Line and Ropes Course

In May 2014, Moody Gardens opened the tallest steel ropes course on the Gulf Coast. The ropes course and zip line was manufactured, installed, and is serviced by Ropes Courses Inc. The ropes course and zip line is open year-round during the weekend and the weekdays during school holidays and the weekday evening during Festival of Lights.

It has 9 obstacles (or "elements") and is situated on one level. The open course design allows for easy parent participation for any level of assistance needed. Parents can also walk alongside their child.

Each participant (adult and child) is outfitted with a full body harness and a safety lanyard or sling line. This unique system also allows participants to choose their path through the course while going at their own pace with the ability to pass other participants at each platform.

Moody Gardens Golf Course
In 2007, the Moody Foundation signed an agreement with the City of Galveston to completely rebuild the city's municipal golf course. The course reopened in June 2008 under the moniker Moody Gardens Golf Course. The $17 million comprehensive renovation, included the addition of new turf grass, green complexes, elevations, irrigation, drainage, cart paths, greens and a full clubhouse renovation.

The new course was designed by Peter Jacobsen of Jacobsen Hardy Golf Course Design and was constructed to keep historical features of the course while improving certain holes and course flow. The par 72 course measures 6,900 yards from the back tees, with 5 sets of tees to accommodate all playing abilities.

Festival of Lights
Each November and December Moody Gardens hosts the Festival of Lights. A mile long trail features one million lights themed to holiday music with live entertainment and an outdoor ice rink. Additional attractions include holiday films at the MG3D Theater, 4D Special FX Theater and Ridefilm Theater. A holiday buffet is featured in the Garden Restaurant and the Colonel Paddlewheel Boat offers evening cruises.

References

External links

 
 The Moody Foundation
 Moody Gardens Golf Course

Aquaria in Texas
Botanical gardens in Texas
Culture of Galveston, Texas
Tourist attractions in Galveston, Texas
Museums in Galveston, Texas
Science museums in Texas
Pyramids in the United States
1986 establishments in Texas